CanDo4Kids is South Australia's oldest charity and works directly with children and young adults with sensory impairment disabilities, such as blindness and deafness, by focusing on what children "can do" and helping them to reach their full potential.

Formerly known as Townsend House, the charity was founded in 1874 by William Townsend MP, who, after two terms in office as Mayor of Adelaide, set about fulfilling his ambition to establish a "Blind Asylum in the City of Adelaide".

Services
CanDo4Kids offers services to children and young adults including: Speech Pathology, Early Intervention, Occupational Therapy, Family Support, Assistive Technology, Youth work, Recreation Auditory Processing Disorder intervention, Auditory Verbal Therapy, Mentor Programs and Counselling.

All services are provided free of charge to children and young adults who are deaf, blind or who have a sensory impairment. CanDo4Kids works with more than 800 children and young adults (up to 25 years) and their families, and has expanded its work with a 300 per cent increase in services to the community since 2002.

Funding for CanDo4Kids is raised through sponsorship, donations, bequests, grants, lotteries, events and property development, with 30 per cent of overall funding coming from the Government.  CanDo4Kids is an affiliated with Charity Direct, an organisation that promotes ethical fund raising behaviour.

CanDo4Kids' sister organisation is Deaf CanDo and both organisations are managed by parent organisation CanDo Group Charities. Deaf CanDo is the State's second oldest charity and provides services and programs which help the Deaf community.

History
Founded in 1874 as the South Australian Institution for the Blind, Deaf and Dumb (Incorporated), later changed to Townsend House, the charity opened its doors to five blind and two deaf students, beginning a commitment that continues today. William Townsend, the founder, was the chairman of its committee from 1875 until his death in 1882.

References

External links
 CanDo4Kids website

Organizations established in 1874
Medical and health organisations based in South Australia
Organisations based in Adelaide
Blindness organisations in Australia
Children's charities based in Australia
Deafness charities
Blindness charities
1874 establishments in Australia
Disability organisations based in Australia